Deutschtum is a German term equating to "Germanness". It may either refer to the German character and spirit, the belonging and yearning to the German people or the entirety of German ethnic groups residing in foreign countries.
An anti-Western concept of a romanticized Deutschtum has been an important component of German nationalism, when the conceptions of Volk (people) and Gemeinschaft (community) were driven to their extremes during the Third Reich.

See also
 Volksgemeinschaft
 Britishness
 Romanitas

References

Bibliography

German culture
German nationalism